Belarus has submitted films for the Academy Award for Best International Feature Film since 1994. The award is handed out annually by the United States Academy of Motion Picture Arts and Sciences to a feature-length motion picture produced outside the United States that contains primarily non-English dialogue. It was not created until the 1956 Academy Awards, in which a competitive Academy Award of Merit, known as the Best Foreign Language Film Award, was created for non-English speaking films, and has been given annually since. , five Belarusian films have been submitted for the Academy Award for Best Foreign Language Film, and none of them have been nominated for an Academy Award.

Submissions
The Academy of Motion Picture Arts and Sciences has invited the film industries of various countries to submit their best film for the Academy Award for Best Foreign Language Film since 1956. The Foreign Language Film Award Committee oversees the process and reviews all the submitted films. Following this, they vote via secret ballot to determine the five nominees for the award. Below is a list of the films that have been submitted by Belarus for review by the Academy for the award by year and the respective Academy Awards ceremony.

Independent Belarus has only submitted films to the Oscar Foreign Language Film competition four times. In 1994 and 1996, Belarus selected Jewish-themed films focusing on relations between Polish Jews and Christians before and after World War II. Me Ivan, You Abraham was about the inter-faith friendship between two boys in the 1930s. From Hell to Hell focuses on two families - one Jewish, one Christian - and the tragedy that ensues when one family entrusts their child to the other during the Second World War. Neither film was a majority Belarusian production nor was directed by a Belarusian; Zauberman is French and Astrakhan is Russia. After a 22-year absence from the competition, in 2018 Belarus selected Crystal Swan, a comedy-drama about a young woman trying to get a U.S. visa so she can become a DJ in Chicago. It premiered at the 2018 Karlovy Vary International Film Festival.

The Soviet Union also sent a Belarusian film, Come and See, in 1985 to represent the USSR.

See also
List of Academy Award winners and nominees for Best Foreign Language Film
List of Academy Award-winning foreign language films

Notes

See also
List of Soviet submissions for the Academy Award for Best International Feature Film

References

External links
The Official Academy Awards Database
The Motion Picture Credits Database
IMDb Academy Awards Page

Belarus
Academy Award for Best Foreign Language Film
Lists of films by country of production
Academy Award